Konstantin Ivanov Katsarov (Константин Иванов Кацаров; 31 August 1898, Sofia - 7 October 1980, Montreux) was a Bulgarian lawyer, professor of commercial law and international law at Sofia University. Encyclopedist, geopolitician and theorist of nationalization.

In 1953 he was sentenced in Soviet Bulgaria to 15 years in prison for espionage. A rehabilitator from the Supreme Court of Bulgaria, he left his homeland and lived in exile in Switzerland until his death.

Konstantin Katsarov is the author of more than 10 very serious works, including commercial law and patent law, but is best known in the world for his major work, ″The Theory of Nationalisation″, which was published in French by the University of Paris in 1960, after which has been translated into seven other languages and published in eleven countries.

In 2017, posthumously, which happens very rarely, Professor Konstantin Katsarov was awarded the Order of Saints Cyril and Methodius. That same year, for the first time, his work ″Theory of Nationalization″ was translated into his native Bulgarian language.

References

Academic staff of the University of Geneva
1898 births
1980 deaths
Academic staff of Sofia University
People from Sofia
University of Zurich alumni
Bulgarian memoirists
Geopoliticians
20th-century Bulgarian writers
Swiss jurists
Patent attorneys